Zhouia amylolytica is a Gram-negative and non-spore-forming bacterium from the genus of Zhouia which has been isolated from sediments from the South China Sea.

References

Flavobacteria
Bacteria described in 2006